ESIC may refer to:

Governing bodies 
Employees' State Insurance, statutory body in India
Esports Integrity Commission, regulatory body in esports

Universities 
ESIC University (Escuela Superior de Ingenieros Comerciales), university in Pozuelo de Alarcón, Spain
 Employees State Insurance Corporation Medical College, India
ESIC Medical College, Alwar, medical college in Alwar, India
ESIC Medical College, Faridabad, medical college in Faridabad, India
ESIC Medical College, Gulbarga, medical college in Gulbarga, India
ESIC Medical College, Kolkata, medical college in Kolkata, India
ESIC Medical College and PGIMSR, Kalaburagi, medical college in Kalaburagi, India
SAMIS-ESIC School of Information and Communication, college in Amparibem, Madagascar
Government Medical College, Kollam, formerly known as ESIC Medical College, Parippally

Other uses 
Early stage innovation company, concept in the Australian tax code designed to attract early-stage investment capital from investors

See also

 
 ESIC Nagar metro station, Mumbai Metro, Mumbai, India
 ESIC Medical College (disambiguation)